Salacia fimbrisepala is a species of plant in the family Celastraceae. It is found in Cameroon and Ghana. Its natural habitat is subtropical or tropical dry forests. It is threatened by habitat loss.

References

Critically endangered plants
Flora of Cameroon
Flora of Ghana
fimbrisepala
Taxonomy articles created by Polbot